Moore's Hill United Methodist Church, also known as Methodist Episcopal Church, is a historic Methodist church located at 13476 Main Street in Moores Hill, Dearborn County, Indiana. It was built in 1871, and is a simple one-story, gable front, brick building with Greek Revival and Italianate style design elements.  It rests on a limestone foundation and has four Doric order pilasters on the front facade.

It was added to the National Register of Historic Places in 1997.

Due to declining membership, the church shut down in 2020 and is now ran by Abundant Grace Bible Fellowship, a local non-denominational ministry.

References

Methodist churches in Indiana
Churches on the National Register of Historic Places in Indiana
Greek Revival church buildings in Indiana
Italianate architecture in Indiana
Churches completed in 1871
Churches in Dearborn County, Indiana
National Register of Historic Places in Dearborn County, Indiana
Italianate church buildings in the United States